One More Goodnight Kiss is an album by folk singer/guitarist Greg Brown, released in 1988. This release contains one of Brown's more well-known songs, "Canned Goods", a song dedicated to his grandmother.

Reception

Writing for Allmusic, music critic Vik Iyengar called the album "Singer/songwriter Greg Brown delivers his first classic on his fourth studio album, One More Goodnight Kiss, where he uses a keen observer's eye and his acoustic guitar to conjure up vivid images from his idyllic childhood... This is a great introduction to his early catalog and the birth of an important contemporary folk artist."

Track listing
All song by Greg Brown.
 "One More Goodnight Kiss" – 5:15
 "Say a Little Prayer" – 3:39
 "Mississippi Moon" – 4:39
 "Cheapest Kind" – 5:50
 "Canned Goods" – 4:08
 "I Can't Get Used to It" – 4:02
 "Rooty Toot Toot for the Moon" – 3:33
 "Walking Down to Casey's" – 5:06
 "Speed Trap Boogie" – 3:53
 "Our Little Town" – 3:46
 "Wash My Eyes" – 2:37
 "Cronies" – 2:54
 "It Gets Lonely in a Small Town" – 4:47
 "I Wish I Was a Painter" – 4:19

Personnel
Greg Brown – vocals, guitar
Peter Ostroushko – violin
Marc Anderson – percussion
Pat Donohue – guitar
John Angus Foster – bass
Dan Lund – guitar
Radoslav Lorković – keyboards
Steve Pikal – trombone

Production
Produced by Greg Brown and Bob Feldman
Engineered and mixed by Tom Mudge
Photography by Radoslav Lorković
Artwork and design by George Ostroushko

References

Greg Brown (folk musician) albums
1988 albums
Red House Records albums